Mount Watters is a massive peak westward of Scythian Nunatak in the Allan Hills, Victoria Land. Reconnoitered by the New Zealand Antarctic Research Program (NZARP) Allan Hills Expedition (1964) and named after W.A. Watters, a geologist with the expedition.

Mountains of Oates Land